Raymond "R. J." Perry Stanford Jr. (born May 6, 1988) is a former American football cornerback. Stanford was drafted by the Carolina Panthers in the seventh round of the 2010 NFL Draft. He played college football at Utah. After retirement he became an agent in the United States Secret Service.

High school
He attended Chino High School in Chino, California. He was a first-team all C.I.F. and conference offensive player of the year in 2004-05. He carried the ball 233 times without a fumble as a senior, when he rushed for 1,800 yards and 28 touchdowns.

Considered a three-star recruit by Rivals.com, he was rated as the 16th best all-purpose back of his class.

College career
While playing for the Utah Utes, he started at cornerback and at nickelback and played in 51 of 52 total games during his career, the lone exception being his college debut as a true freshman in 2006. Stanford began his college career as a running back before transitioning to the cornerback position midway through his freshman year.

Professional career

Carolina Panthers
Stanford was drafted by the Carolina Panthers in the seventh round, 223rd overall of the 2010 NFL Draft. He was waived by the Panthers on August 31, 2012.

Miami Dolphins
He was claimed off waivers by the Miami Dolphins on September 1, 2012. He suffered a broken leg in a Week 14 matchup against the Pittsburgh Steelers on December 7, 2013.

Cincinnati Bengals
On March 24, 2014, Stanford signed a one-year deal worth $805,000 with the Cincinnati Bengals. The Bengals released Stanford on August 25, 2014.

Second stint with the Miami Dolphins
Stanford signed with the Miami Dolphins on November 25, 2014.

Detroit Lions
On July 28, 2015, Stanford signed with the Detroit Lions.

References

External links

Utah Utes Bio
Miami Dolphins Bio

1988 births
Living people
American football cornerbacks
Carolina Panthers players
Cincinnati Bengals players
Detroit Lions players
Miami Dolphins players
People from Chino, California
Players of American football from California
Sportspeople from San Bernardino County, California
United States Secret Service agents
Utah Utes football players